Thomas Holzmann (born July 17, 1987) is a German professional ice hockey forward who currently plays for EV Landshut of the DEL2.

Playing career
Holzmann began his career as a junior in the ESV Kaufbueren organization. He made his DEL debut with the Hannover Scorpions before joining and breaking out with 26 points in 50 games with the Kassel Huskies in the 2009–10 season. Following the dissolution of the Huskies, Holzmann then signed a two-year contract with the Hamburg Freezers on May 22, 2010.

Unable to repeat his successful season in 2010–11, posting 4 points in 48 games, Holzmann was released from the second year of his contract with the Freezers to join the Iserlohn Roosters on a new two-year deal on June 21, 2011.

After two seasons with the Roosters, Holzmann left to sign a contract with EHC München on May 31, 2013. Following his second season with Red Bull in 2014–15 season, Holzmann was not tendered a new contract by Munich to sign as a free agent to a one-year deal with Augsburger Panther on April 3, 2015.

Career statistics

References

External links

1987 births
Living people
Augsburger Panther players
ETC Crimmitschau players
Hamburg Freezers players
Hannover Scorpions players
Iserlohn Roosters players
Kassel Huskies players
ESV Kaufbeuren players
EHC München players
German ice hockey forwards
People from Ostallgäu
Sportspeople from Swabia (Bavaria)